Baron Parmoor, of Frieth in the County of Buckingham, is a title in the Peerage of the United Kingdom. It was created on 16 January 1914 for the lawyer and politician Sir Charles Cripps. He and his wife, Marian Ellis, were anti-war activists. Two of his sons, the second and third Baron, both succeeded in the title. The third Baron was succeeded by his son, the fourth Baron.  the title is held by the latter's first cousin, the fifth Baron, who succeeded in 2008. He is the grandson of Major the Hon. Leonard Harrison Cripps, third son of the first Baron.

The Labour politician the Hon. Sir Stafford Cripps was the youngest son of the first Baron. Violet Cripps, Baroness Parmoor, wife of the 3rd Baron and mother of the 4th Baron, was the second wife of Hugh Grosvenor, 2nd Duke of Westminster.

His daughter, Ruth Julia Cripps, married Sir Alfred Egerton in 1912, becoming the Hon Lady Egerton. They had no children but did adopt a nephew. She set up and was the chairman of the Women's Advisory Council on Solid Fuels in 1943.

Parmoor House in Parmoor hamlet near Frieth, Buckinghamshire, was the home of the first Baron Parmoor.

Barons Parmoor (1914)
Charles Alfred Cripps, 1st Baron Parmoor (1852–1941)
(Alfred Henry) Seddon Cripps, 2nd Baron Parmoor (1882–1977)
Frederick Heyworth Cripps, 3rd Baron Parmoor (1885–1977)
(Frederick Alfred) Milo Cripps, 4th Baron Parmoor (1929–2008)
(Michael Leonard) Seddon Cripps, 5th Baron Parmoor (b. 1942)

The heir apparent is the present holder's son Hon. Henry William Anthony Cripps (b. 1976).

Arms

References 

Kidd, Charles, Williamson, David (editors). Debrett's Peerage and Baronetage (1990 edition). New York: St Martin's Press, 1990, 

 
1914 establishments in the United Kingdom
Baronies in the Peerage of the United Kingdom
Noble titles created in 1914
Noble titles created for UK MPs
History of Buckinghamshire